Thakur Prithvi Singh Deora ( – 26 November 2019) was an Indian politician from Rajasthan belonging to Swatantra Party. He was a member of the Rajasthan Legislative Assembly.

Biography
Deora was elected as a member of the Rajasthan Legislative Assembly from Bali in 1967.

Deora died on 26 November 2019 at the age of 85.

References

1930s births
2019 deaths
Members of the Rajasthan Legislative Assembly
Swatantra Party politicians
People from Pali district